The McDonald–Bolner House is a historic house in Fayetteville, Tennessee. It was built in 1859 for R. A. McDonald, a cotton farmer, and his wife, née Martha Cordelia McKinney. It remained in the McDonald family until the 1870s. It was purchased by Thomas E. Bolner in 1959.

The house was designed in the Gothic Revival architectural style. It has been listed on the National Register of Historic Places since May 31, 1984.

References

Houses on the National Register of Historic Places in Tennessee
National Register of Historic Places in Lincoln County, Tennessee
Gothic Revival architecture in Tennessee
Houses completed in 1859